Joseph Henry Léopold Sylvestre (13 December 1911 – 11 December 1972) was a Canadian speed skater. He competed in the men's 500 metres event at the 1932 Winter Olympics.

By 1962, Sylvester had become a coaching staff manager in Mount Royal, Quebec, working alongside Johnny Sands. He died in 1972.

References

1911 births
1972 deaths
Canadian male speed skaters
Olympic speed skaters of Canada
Speed skaters at the 1932 Winter Olympics
Speed skaters from Montreal
20th-century Canadian people